Allicin is an organosulfur compound obtained from garlic, a species in the family Alliaceae. It was first isolated and studied in the laboratory by Chester J. Cavallito and John Hays Bailey in 1944. When fresh garlic is chopped or crushed, the enzyme alliinase converts alliin into allicin, which is responsible for the aroma of fresh garlic. The allicin generated is unstable and quickly changes into a series of other sulfur-containing compounds such as diallyl disulfide. Allicin is part of a defense mechanism against attacks by pests on the garlic plant.

Allicin is an oily, slightly yellow liquid that gives garlic its distinctive odor. It is a thioester of sulfenic acid and is also known as allyl thiosulfinate. Its biological activity can be attributed to both its antioxidant activity and its reaction with thiol-containing proteins. Produced in garlic cells, allicin is released upon disruption, producing a potent aroma when garlic is cut or cooked, and is among the chemicals responsible for both the smell and flavour of garlic.

Structure and occurrence
Allicin features the thiosulfinate functional group, R-S-(O)-S-R. The compound is not present in garlic unless tissue damage occurs, and is formed by the action of the enzyme alliinase on alliin. Allicin is chiral but occurs naturally only as a racemate. The racemic form can also be generated by oxidation of diallyl disulfide:
(SCH2CH=CH2)2 + 2 RCO3H  +  H2O → 2 CH2=CHCH2SOH + 2 RCO2H
2 CH2=CHCH2SOH  →  CH2=CHCH2S(O)SCH2CH=CH2 + H2O

Alliinase is irreversibly deactivated below pH 3; as such, allicin is generally not produced in the body from the consumption of fresh or powdered garlic. Furthermore, allicin can be unstable, breaking down within 16 hours at 23 °C.

Biosynthesis
The biosynthesis of allicin commences with the conversion of cysteine into S-allyl-L-cysteine.  Oxidation of this thioether gives the sulfoxide (alliin). The enzyme alliinase, which contains pyridoxal phosphate (PLP), cleaves alliin, generating allylsulfenic acid (CH2=CHCH2SOH), pyruvate, and ammonium ions. At room temperature, two molecules of allylsulfenic acid condense to form allicin.

Research
Allicin has been studied for its potential to treat various kinds of multiple drug resistance bacterial infections, as well as viral and fungal infections in vitro, but as of 2016, the safety and efficacy of allicin to treat infections in people was unclear.

In a small clinical trial, a daily high dose of extracted allicin (20 times the amount in a garlic clove) showed effectiveness to prevent the common cold. A Cochrane review found this to be insufficient to draw conclusions.

A study from 2021 has shown "a combination of the short half-life, high reactivity and non-specificity to particular proteins are reasons most bacteria cannot deal with allicin’s mode of action and develop effective defence mechanism" and argue "that could be the key to sustainable drug design addressing serious problems with escalating emergence of multidrug-resistant bacterial strains".

History
Allicin was discovered as part of efforts to create thiamine derivatives in the 1940s, mainly in Japan.  Allicin became a model for medicinal chemistry efforts to create other thiamine disulfides.  The results included sulbutiamine, fursultiamine (thiamine tetrahydrofurfuryl disulfide) and benfothiamine.  These compounds are hydrophobic, easily pass from the intestines to the bloodstream, and are reduced to thiamine by cysteine or glutathione.

See also 

 Allyl isothiocyanate, the active piquant chemical in mustard, radishes, horseradish and wasabi
 syn-Propanethial-S-oxide, the lachrymatory chemical found in onions
 List of phytochemicals in food

References 

Thiosulfinates
Anti-inflammatory agents
Antibiotics
Dietary antioxidants
Pungent flavors
Allium
Garlic
Antifungals
Allyl compounds